Halychian may refer to:

 something or someone related to the city of Halych, in modern Ukraine
 Halychian Principality, an East Slavic medieval state, centered in Halych
 Halychian-Volhynian Principality, an East Slavic medieval state, uniting Halych and Volhynia
 Halychian Wars, series of medieval wars in the region of Halych
 Halychian Metropolitanate, an Eastern Orthodox Metropolitanate of Halych
 Kievan-Halychian Major Archeparchy, a diocese of the Ukrainian Byzantine Catholic Church
 Halychian Land (ziemia), a province of the early modern Kingdom of Poland
 Halych Raion, former administrative region, centered in the city of Halych
 Halychian-Volhynian Chronicle, medieval East Slavic chronicle

See also
 Galician (disambiguation)
 Galicia (disambiguation)